Michel Jobert (11 September 1921 – 25 May 2002) was a French politician of the left-wing Gaullist orientation. He served as Minister of Foreign Affairs under Georges Pompidou, and as Minister of External Commerce under François Mitterrand.

His tenure was marked, in part, by tense relations with the United States as he pursued French independence in the sphere of foreign relations. This policy at one point led a frustrated Henry Kissinger to call him "an idiot" and a "bad" foreign minister. Jobert died on 25 May 2002 in Paris, aged 80.

References

1921 births
2002 deaths
French Foreign Ministers
Politicians of the French Fifth Republic
Sciences Po alumni
École nationale d'administration alumni
People from Meknes
Member of the Academy of the Kingdom of Morocco